Hefriga is an extinct genus of shrimp in the order Decapoda. It contains three species, and lived in the Jurassic period.

References

Caridea
Jurassic crustaceans
Fossils of Germany